Iododermas are caused by iodides, with the most common sources of exposure being oral and intravenous contrast materials used to treat thyroid disease.  The most common type of eruption is an acneiform eruption with numerous acutely inflamed follicular pustules, each surrounded by a ring of hyperemia.

See also
Skin lesion
 List of cutaneous conditions

References

External links 

 

Drug eruptions